The 2016 Malaysia Cup Final was a football match which was played on 30 October 2016, to determine the champion of the 2016 Malaysia Cup. It was the final of the 90th edition of the Malaysia Cup, competition organised by the Football Association of Malaysia.

It was played at the Shah Alam Stadium, in Shah Alam, Selangor, between Selangor and Kedah, in a repeat of the 2015 Final.

Venue
The final was held at the Shah Alam Stadium.

Road to final

Note: In all results below, the score of the finalist is given first.

Match details

Statistics

References

External links
FAM Official website

Malaysia Cup seasons
2015 in Malaysian football